Henry Bayley Clive (1800 – 26 February 1870) was a British Conservative politician.

Clive was elected Conservative Member of Parliament for Ludlow at the 1847 general election and held the seat until 1852 when he did not seek re-election.

References

External links
 

UK MPs 1847–1852
Conservative Party (UK) MPs for English constituencies
1800 births
1870 deaths